George Francis Flaherty, Jr. (January 6, 1926 – April 9, 2002), known professionally as Pat Flaherty, was an American racecar driver who won the Indianapolis 500 in 1956.

He drove in the AAA and USAC Championship Car series, racing in the 1950, 1953–1956, 1958–1959, and 1963 seasons with 19 starts, including the Indianapolis 500 races in 1950, 1953, 1955, 1956, and 1959. He finished in the top ten 9 times, with victories in 1955 and 1956 at Milwaukee as well as the 1956 Indianapolis 500. Born in Glendale, California, Flaherty died in Oxnard, California.

World Championship career summary
The Indianapolis 500 was part of the FIA World Championship from 1950 through 1960. Drivers competing at Indy during those years were credited with World Championship points and participation. Pat Flaherty participated in 7 World Championship races. He started on the pole once, won once, and accumulated a total of 8 championship points. 

After winning the 1956 Indianapolis 500, Flaherty was severely injured in a race car crash less than three months later, which prevented him from racing at the 1957 500. Flaherty successfully raced pigeons for over twenty years after he retired from auto racing. He also built and publicised a portable go-kart track where he would race against all-comers.

Complete AAA/USAC Championship Car results

Indianapolis 500 results

* Shared drive with Jim Rathmann

References

External links

1926 births
2002 deaths
American racing drivers
Indianapolis 500 drivers
Indianapolis 500 polesitters
Indianapolis 500 winners
Sportspeople from Glendale, California
Racing drivers from California
AAA Championship Car drivers
Formula One race winners
USAC Stock Car drivers